This is a list of notable nightclubs in Sweden:

Stockholm 

 (defunct)
Bacchi Wapen (defunct)

Café Opera, a nightclub located in the Opera Building.  It was formerly a football club.
 (defunct)
 (defunct)
Crazy Horse, Stockholm (defunct)
 (defunct)
 (defunct)

 (defunct)
 (defunct)
 (defunct)

Sturecompagniet, one of Sweden's biggest and best known nightclubs.  Site of a mass-murder in 1994, see .

 (defunct)

Elsewhere 
Barbarella, Växjö (defunct)
, Sundbyberg
, Gothenburg
, Visby
, Västervik
, Gothenburg
, Gothenburg

External links 
 

 
Lists of music venues
Nightclubs
Nightclubs